Philip Connelly (1881 – 1960) was a New Zealand cricketer. He played in two first-class matches for Wellington in 1908/09.

See also
 List of Wellington representative cricketers

References

1881 births
1960 deaths
New Zealand cricketers
Wellington cricketers